James McDonnell Tennant (March 3, 1907 – April 16, 1967) was a pitcher in Major League Baseball. He made one relief appearance for the New York Giants, on September 28, 1929, as the third of four pitchers in relief of Carl Hubbell. Tennant also played for George Washington University and Elizabethtown College.

References

External links

1907 births
1967 deaths
Major League Baseball pitchers
Elizabethtown Blue Jays baseball players
New York Giants (NL) players
Baseball players from West Virginia
People from Shepherdstown, West Virginia
People from Trumbull, Connecticut
George Washington University alumni
Elizabethtown College alumni
George Washington Colonials baseball players